= Kiltamany =

Village

Kiltamany is a village in Kenya.
